Dennerle is a German company producing aquarium and pond supplies.

Support of science
The crab Geosesarma dennerle is named after the company, because of the company's support of Christian Lukhaup. G. dennerle is a popular crab in the aquarium trade, where it was traded long before it was scientifically described.

The shrimp Caridina dennerli is also named after the company, which supported the expedition that led to the scientific description of the species. It is popularly known as the 'Cardinal Shrimp' in the aquarium trade.

References

External links
Dennerle

Fishkeeping